Oreodera cinerea is a species of beetle in the family Cerambycidae. It was first described by Audinet-Serville in 1835.

References

Oreodera
Beetles described in 1835